Shewanella arctica is a Gram-negative and anaerobic bacterium from the genus of Shewanella which has been isolated from sediment from the Arctic.

References

External links
Type strain of Shewanella arctica at BacDive -  the Bacterial Diversity Metadatabase

Alteromonadales
Bacteria described in 2012